is a temple of the Jōdo Shinshū Hongwanji-ha Japanese Buddhist sect in Fairfax Station, Virginia, near Washington, D.C. It is a member of the Buddhist Churches of America, the oldest Buddhist organization in the mainland United States. 

Ekoji (literally in Japanese, "Temple of the Gift of Light") was founded in 1981; its initial location was an office condominium building located in Springfield, Virginia, and a larger temple was constructed in Fairfax Station, Virginia, in 1998. The temple was established through the beneficial efforts of the late Rev. Kenryu Tsuji (1919-2004), the former Bishop of the Buddhist Churches of America, and the late Rev. Dr. Yehan Numata, a Japanese businessman and devout Jodo Shinshu Buddhist. He also established the Bukkyo Dendo Kyokai ("Society for the Promotion of Buddhism") to help spread Buddhism throughout the world. 

Reverend Nariaki Hayashi became the full-time resident minister in 2016. However, as of 2022, he has left to be the minister of the Tri-State Denver Buddhist Temple.

There are several Ekoji Temples in Japan, as well as in Düsseldorf, Germany and Mexico City.

External links
Ekoji Buddhist Temple, Jodo Shinshu Buddhism (Nishi Hongwanji), Northern Virginia near Washington, D.C.
Bukkyo Dendo Kyokai (BDK): Society for the Promotion of Buddhism

Buddhist temples in Virginia
Buildings and structures in Fairfax County, Virginia
Japanese-American culture in Virginia
Religious buildings and structures completed in 1998
Religious organizations established in 1981
1981 establishments in Virginia
Buddhist Churches of America
20th-century Buddhist temples
Shinshū Honganji-ha temples